Jessica Marie Johnson is an American historian and Black studies scholar specializing in the history of the Atlantic slave trade. She is an associate professor in the department of history at the Johns Hopkins University Zanvyl Krieger School of Arts and Sciences. In 2020, Johnson published a Black feminist history of the founding of New Orleans titled Wicked Flesh: Black Women, Intimacy, and Freedom in the Atlantic World.

Life 
Johnson completed a Ph.D. at the University of Maryland, College Park. Her 2012 dissertation was titled Freedom, kinship, and property: free women of African descent in the French Atlantic, 1685–1810. Her doctoral advisor was Ira Berlin. She is a Black studies scholar and a historian of the Atlantic slave trade.

Johnson began radical black feminist blogging under the pseudonym Kismet Nuñez. In 2020, Johnson authored a Black feminist history of the founding of New Orleans, titled Wicked Flesh: Black Women, Intimacy, and Freedom in the Atlantic World. It received an honorable mention for the Frederick Jackson Turner Award. 

Johnson is an associate professor in the department of history at the Johns Hopkins University Zanvyl Krieger School of Arts and Sciences.

Selected works

Books

Journal articles

References

External links
 

21st-century African-American women
21st-century American historians
21st-century American women writers
African-American bloggers
African-American feminists
African-American historians
African-American women academics
American women academics
African-American academics
American feminist writers
American women bloggers
American bloggers
American women historians
Black studies scholars
Feminist bloggers
Feminist historians
Historians of African Americans
Johns Hopkins University faculty
Living people
Place of birth missing (living people)
University of Maryland, College Park alumni
Year of birth missing (living people)